Amărăști is a commune located in Vâlcea County, Oltenia, Romania. It is composed of six villages: Amărăști, Mereșești, Nemoiu, Padina, Palanga and Teiul.

References

Communes in Vâlcea County
Localities in Oltenia